The Boar's Head Feast is a festival of the Christmas season.

Observances

The fest of the Presentation of the Boar's Head is observed at:

 Asylum Hill Congregational Church in Hartford, Connecticut
 Bethlehem Lutheran Church in Saginaw, Michigan 
Lutheran Church in St. Charles, Missouri 
Saint Paul United Methodist Church in Louisville, Kentucky 
The First Church of Winsted in Winsted, Connecticut 
Third Presbyterian Church in Rochester, New York
Trinity Cathedral in Cleveland, Ohio
St. Peter's Lutheran Church in Lafayette Hill, Pennsylvania
First United Methodist Church in Huntsville, Alabama 
Trinity United Methodist Church in Springfield, Massachusetts
St. John's Episcopal Church in Youngstown, Ohio
Ivy Hall in West Philadelphia, PA. Presented by The Cephalophore Society, a group of Catholic Gentlemen, annually on the feast of St. Thomas Becket
Plymouth Congregational Church in Fort Wayne, Indiana (since 1975)
Christ Presbyterian Church in Ellwood City, Pennsylvania
Hoosac School, Hoosick, New York
University Christian Church in Fort Worth, Texas
Christ Church Cathedral, Cincinnati in Cincinnati, OH

Oglethorpe University
Oglethorpe University in Atlanta, Georgia celebrates the Boar's Head Ceremony annually on the first Friday in December. Members of the Omicron Delta Kappa society process with a roasted boar's head, followed by a reading of the "Boar's Head" story, a concert and a Christmas tree lighting. University tradition associates the observance with the arms of the university's namesake, James Edward Oglethorpe, depicting three boars' heads and a fourth as a crest.

Queens University of Charlotte 
Through the efforts of Miss Alma Edwards, a greatly beloved Latin professor at Queens University of Charlotte, Queens hosted the first Boar's Head dinner in 1932, which has remained an annual event since that time. The annual feast is hosted by the Department of Student Engagement, within the Division of Student Life, and is a tradition in which seniors are asked to play roles within the telling of the boar's head story with performances by the Dance Club and Choir. Young Dining Hall is decorated for the feast and meals are served family style. The President of the University, and family, is in attendance yearly and personally invites three to four guest to sit with him/her at the head table. The President, President's guest, and seniors within the program, dress in renaissance regalia. Queens presents two boar's heads at the feast, carried in by seniors. At the end of the feast, two faculty members, nominated by seniors, conduct the annual Yule Log Ceremony, weaving through the hall as students tap their holly branches on the yule log for good luck for the new year. At the conclusion of the event, students walk to the fire pit where they throw their holly branches into the fire and sing carols. Information of the history of this event may be found within the archives of Everett Library on campus.

University of Rochester 
In 1934, the presidency of Benjamin Rush Rhees was waning and that of Alan Valentine was rising. Valentine, a Rhodes Scholar at Balliol College, Oxford, helped to solidify this tradition at Rochester. This American variant honors a professor and a club at the university each year hence. The professor is responsible for the recounting of the tale of the boar, often at the expense of the students enrolled in their classes. The student club honored receives the head of the slain boar, the highest honor for that academic year. The feast has been held in numerous locations on the River Campus and has settled into the newly refurbished Richard Feldman Ballroom.

See also
 Sonargöltr
 List of dining events

References

External links
The Queen’s College, Oxford
St. John's College, Cambridge
The Legend of the Boar
Hurstpierpoint College

Christmas festivals
Christmas meals and feasts
Academic meals